America on Parade ("AOP") was a temporary replacement for Disneyland's and the Magic Kingdom's The Main Street Electrical Parade ("MSEP") for the United States Bicentennial and for Disneyland's 20th and The Magic Kingdom's 5th anniversaries.

Like the Main Street Electrical Parade it was also created under the direction of Disneyland's Director of Entertainment, Bob Jani.  The parade float units were designed by New York theatrical designer Peter Larkin. The first run was in the summer of 1975 and was originally designed to run through 1977, to commemorate the United States Bicentennial. Where the Main Street Electrical Parade ran twice nightly, America On Parade ran once during the afternoon and again just prior to the nightly fireworks display. It traveled the full length of Disneyland from It's a Small World to Town Square at the beginning of Main Street, U.S.A. and at Magic Kingdom from Liberty Square to Town Square at the beginning of Main Street, U.S.A. The various parade float height design created a problem because returning the parade units to the starting point required traveling behind the Disneyland Public areas, encountering over-pass bridges and tunnels.  The taller units were rigged to telescope up after collapsing to pass under the low ceiling obstacles.  Other units' stacked towers were hinged to drop or fold on top of the parade float. Each float was an engineered marvel which the public never viewed after the parade terminated at the Main Street finale.

Soundtrack
The Sherman Brothers who had left Disney Studios to work for independent film companies were asked to write a specialty song for the American Bicentennial. The song was called "The Glorious Fourth" and was performed as a part of AOP.

The parade also featured synchronized music to which performers danced set routines created by Disneyland choreographers (Barnett Ricci and Marilyn Magness). Each of the parade performers sported costumes appropriate to the float around which they danced, as well as enormous heads fixed on a custom-built apparatus for support, with the performer looking through the neck, giving the parade a carnival appearance.

The parade's soundtrack was Don Dorsey's first project for Disney. He used synthesizers and antique carousel organs to create the soundtrack. During the parade's run, Dorsey conceptualized a system which Disney would develop a computer-controlled system called "Mickey Track" that controls the parade's music from 1980 and on.

TV Special
In 1976, a TV Special "Walt Disney's America on Parade" aired, showing the parade and presented by Red Skelton.

Floats 

 Spirit of '76 - The starting float featured Mickey Mouse, Donald Duck, and Goofy standing on a drum, next to a heavily themed eagle float, with Mickey holding a variant of the Stars and Stripes as the three friends all opened the parade. Donald played the flute, and Goofy played a hand-made drum.
 Columbus's Ship - In 1492, before the creation of America, Italian explorer Christopher Columbus travelled the then-unknown seas, seeing what kind of discoveries he has managed to find and bring him into the new worlds. This float resembled a pirate ship.
 The First Thanksgiving - In 1621, the Pilgrims created what would become Thanksgiving. This float was represented by a giant turkey puppet.
 Salem Witch Trials - In 1692, more than two hundred people were accused of witchcraft in colonial Massachusetts. This float featured two costumed characters about to be executed with another preparing the execution.
 Benjamin Franklin - In 1752, Benjamin Franklin flew a kite during a thunderstorm and discovered the power of electricity. This float featured Benjamin Franklin flying a kite without lightning.
 Dunking Stall
 Square Dancing
 Giant Bell
 Giant Cannons
 Betsy Ross - In June 1776, Betsy Ross raised the flag of what would be the United States in Philadelphia at the request of George Washington.
 Rowing Boat
 Riverboat
 Stagecoach
 Discovery of Gold
 Voting Rights
 Sunday Band Concert
 School Days
 Transportation
 Sports
 Sunday Picnic
 Modern Tech
 Snow White and the Seven Dwarfs
 Television
 The Movie Industry
 Circus Comes to Town
 Hot Air Balloons
 Statue of Liberty and the Golden Eagle

Accidents 

In 1976, an unidentified woman sued the Disney Parks Corporation because she claimed that one of the Three Little Pigs at the It's a Small World parade route area grabbed and fondled her during this parade. She claimed to have gained 50 pounds (23 kg) as a result of the incident and sued Disney for $150,000 in damages for assault and battery, false imprisonment, and humiliation. The plaintiff dropped charges after Disney's lawyers presented her with a photo of the costume, which had only inoperable stub arms, a common feature among the shorter characters that was eliminated in later years.

See also
 Magic Kingdom attraction and entertainment history
 Disney's Fantillusion (the 2nd longest parade after AOP and the official successor of SpectroMagic)
 the wonderful world of Disney parade (the 3rd longest parade after AOP and DF)
 the incredible new years parade (the 4th longest parade after AOP and DF and TWWODP)
 List of incidents at Disneyland Resort

References

 Sherman, Robert B. Walt's Time: from before to beyond. Santa Clarita: Camphor Tree Publishers, 1998.

External links
 TV special: 

Amusement park attractions introduced in 1975
Amusement park attractions that closed in 1977
Former Walt Disney Parks and Resorts attractions
Walt Disney Parks and Resorts parades
United States Bicentennial
Cultural depictions of Benjamin Franklin
Cultural depictions of Christopher Columbus
Cultural depictions of Betsy Ross